William Henry Bay is a waterway in the U.S. state of Alaska. It is located near Haines in the Alexander Archipelago. The only commercial copper deposit in Southeast Alaska situated north of Prince of Wales Island was located in the bay. Significant gold and strategic mineral anomalies were found at William Henry Bay during surveys in 2011.

Geography

 Beardslee River flows down a few cascades into its head. About  to the north-west from William Henry Bay is Endicott River, coming in from the west through a narrow, deep gorge in the mountains.

History
After Alaska was purchased by the US Government in 1867, the first effort to identify the timber trade route from Lynn Canal to Haines via William Henry Bay was made in 1869 by Navy Commander Richard Worsam Meade. Meade adopted the name from the Hudson Bay traders. This was followed up by Navy Commander, Lester A. Beardslee who came to the bay in 1880 and purchased corded firewood. Detailed hydrographic surveys and marine charts were prepared. Farmers came to the bay area, and grew strawberries and  rutabagas. Though telecommunication cables of the Alaska Communications System existed here till the late 1950s, they are not reflected in the latest maps of the bay area.

Mining
In 1921, gold tracer mining was also initiated. During this period, the copper mining operations were not profitable and as a result, the mines were closed and the gold tracer studies were also discontinued. At the initiative of the US Government, in the 1950s, many prospectors tried to locate uranium in the area – what became known as the "uranium rush". Noranda Exploration, Inc. and Nippon Mining commenced core drilling operations in the 1950s, but failed to establish a viable source worthy of economic development. Efforts made in 1985 by Dale Henkins, who had nine continuous federal claims named the "Lucky Six uranium prospect", proved to be non-profitable. During 2011, prospecting for gold and strategic mineral anomalies were pursued by Alaska state geologists, and findings of gold and strategic mineral anomalies (including rare earth elements) were reported in William Henry Bay.

See also
Copper mining in the United States
Lists of copper mines in the United States

References

Bays of Alaska
Copper mines in the United States
Bodies of water of Haines Borough, Alaska